Patrick Marran is a South African politician serving as a Member of the Western Cape Provincial Parliament for the African National Congress since May 2019. Marran is the party's spokesperson on agriculture.

Marran is a former councillor in the Breede Valley Local Municipality and the current chairperson of the ANC's Boland region.

References

External links

Living people
Year of birth missing (living people)
Coloured South African people
African National Congress politicians
Members of the Western Cape Provincial Parliament